The 2022 SpeedyCash.com 220 was the ninth stock car race of the 2022 NASCAR Camping World Truck Series and the 26th iteration of the event. The race was held on Friday, May 20, 2022, in Fort Worth, Texas at Texas Motor Speedway, a  permanent quad-oval racetrack. The race was extended from 147 laps to 149 laps, due to a NASCAR overtime finish. In an exciting final restart, Stewart Friesen, driving for his team, Halmar Friesen Racing, took advantage of the lead over Christian Eckes on the final lap, and earned his third career NASCAR Camping World Truck Series win. It was his first win of the season, and his first win since the 2019 Lucas Oil 150. To fill out the podium, Ryan Preece of David Gilliland Racing would finish third, respectively.

Background 
Texas Motor Speedway is a speedway located in the northernmost portion of the U.S. city of Fort Worth, Texas – the portion located in Denton County, Texas. The reconfigured track measures  with banked 20° in turns 1 and 2 and banked 24° in turns 3 and 4. Texas Motor Speedway is a quad-oval design, where the front straightaway juts outward slightly. The track layout is similar to Atlanta Motor Speedway and Charlotte Motor Speedway. The track is owned by Speedway Motorsports, Inc.

Entry list 

 (R) denotes rookie driver.
 (i) denotes driver who are ineligible for series driver points.

Practice 
The only 30-minute practice session was held on Friday, May 20, at 3:00 PM CST.

Qualifying 
Qualifying was held on Friday, May 20, at 3:30 PM CST. Since Texas Motor Speedway is an oval track, the qualifying system used is a single-car, one-lap system with only one round. Whoever sets the fastest time in the round wins the pole.

Race results 
Stage 1 Laps: 35

Stage 2 Laps: 35

Stage 3 Laps: 79

Standings after the race 

Drivers' Championship standings

Note: Only the first 10 positions are included for the driver standings.

References 

2022 NASCAR Camping World Truck Series
NASCAR races at Texas Motor Speedway
SpeedyCash.com 220
2022 in sports in Texas